Three Words to Forever is a 2018 Philippine family romantic comedy-drama film directed by Cathy Garcia-Molina, starring Richard Gomez, Sharon Cuneta and Kathryn Bernardo. It was released on November 28, 2018, by Star Cinema.

Cast 

 Richard Gomez as Rick Andrada
 Sharon Cuneta as Cristy Andrada
 Kathryn Bernardo as Tin Andrada
 Tommy Esguerra as Kyle
 Liza Lorena as Tinay Andrada
 Freddie Webb as Cito Andrada
 Joross Gamboa as Paeng	
 Hyubs Azarcon
 Marnie Lapus		
 Tobie Dela Cruz
 Cheska Iñigo as Kyle's Mom
 Carla Humphries as Nicole

Theme song 
 The official theme song of the film is Show Me a Smile by the TNT Boys for the first version and Sharon Cuneta for the second version (originally performed by Apo Hiking Society).

See also 
 List of Philippine films of 2018

References

External links 
 

2018 films
Philippine romantic comedy-drama films
2018 romantic comedy-drama films
2010s Tagalog-language films
Star Cinema films
2010s English-language films